Roseanne, Rosanne, Roseann or Rose Ann is a feminine given name, and may refer to:

Topics
 Roseanne Barr (born 1952), also known to use the mononym Roseanne, an American performer with several eponymous TV shows: 
 Roseanne, sitcom
 The Roseanne Show, talk show
 The Real Roseanne Show, reality TV series
 Roseanne's Nuts, reality TV series

People
 Rosanne Cash (born 1955), American singer
 Roseanne A. Brown, Ghanaian American writer. 
 Roseanne Galligan (b. 1987), Irish athlete
 Roseanne Liang, Chinese-New Zealand film director
 Roseanne Park (b. 1997) Korean-New Zealander singer and member of the k-pop girl group Blackpink
 Roseann Quinn (1944-1973), an American schoolteacher whose murder inspired the 1975 novel Looking for Mr. Goodbar and its 1977 film adaptation
 Roseann Runte (b. 1948), a college professor and the President and Vice-Chancellor of Carleton University in Ottawa, Canada
 Rose Ann Scamardella (born c. 1947), American journalist
 Roseanne Skoke (b. 1954), was the Liberal MP for the riding of Central Nova (Nova Scotia, Canada) from 1993 to 1997
 Roseanne Supernault, Canadian actress

Characters
 Roseanne Conner, a fictional character of the television sitcom Roseanne
 Roseanne Roseannadanna, fictional character on Saturday Night Live, television series
 Roseanne Delgado (formerly Vega), a fictional character on the popular long running ABC soap opera One Life to Live

Music
 "Roseanne" (song), a 1975 song by The Guess Who from their album, Power in the Music.

See also 
 Roseanna (disambiguation)
 Rosie (disambiguation)
 Rose (given name)
 Ann (name)
 Annie (given name)
 Roxanne (given name)

Given names derived from plants or flowers